Gerda Geertens (born 11 August 1955) is a Dutch composer. She was born in Wildervank, and studied music and philosophy in Groningen. In 1981 she began the study of composition with Klaas de Vries at the Rotterdam Conservatory. Her compositions include chamber music, choir and solo singing and pieces for symphony orchestras.

Works
Geertens is noted for her chamber works. Selected works include:
Sarka song cycle for soprano and piano, 1993: no. 1. Afrika (Michaël Arnoldus Slory), no. 2. Komoto te na Egypte (Michaël Arnoldus Slory), no. 3. Sarka (Michaël Arnoldus Slory)
Nocturnal for flute, violin, violoncello, piano and percussion, 1994
She Weeps Over Rahoon for solo piano, 1985
Amarillis for 4 bamboo flutes (or recorders 4), 1985
Ash and lilac , for instrumental ensemble, 1988
Slinger, for string trio, 1989
Contrast, for saxophone quartet, 1990
Mexitli , Opus 1 for mixed choir and instrumental ensemble, 1981–1982, text: Theun de Vries
Split country, for violin, bass clarinet and tape, 1992
Leave it alone, audio clip, for 15 players, 1994
Heartland, for orchestra, 1994
Trope, for cello, 1987
en SeringenI, for flute, oboe, clarinet, violin, viola, cello, piano, harp, and percussion, 1988

References

1955 births
Living people
20th-century classical composers
Dutch women classical composers
Dutch classical composers
People from Veendam
20th-century women composers